Androlymnia is a genus of moths of the family Noctuidae.

Species
 Androlymnia clavata Hampson, 1910
 Androlymnia clavata Hampson, 1910
 Androlymnia difformis Roepke, 1938
 Androlymnia emarginata (Hampson, 1891)
 Androlymnia incurvata (Wileman & West, 1929)
 Androlymnia malgassica Viette, 1965
 Androlymnia torsivena (Hampson, 1902)

References
 Androlymnia at Markku Savela's Lepidoptera and Some Other Life Forms
 Natural History Museum Lepidoptera genus database

Acronictinae
Noctuoidea genera